Mannerist architecture and sculpture in Poland dominated between 1550 and 1650, when it was finally replaced with baroque. The style includes various mannerist traditions, which are closely related with ethnic and religious diversity of the country, as well as with its economic and political situation at that time. The mannerist complex of Kalwaria Zebrzydowska and mannerist City of Zamość are UNESCO World Heritage Sites.

Conditions of development and features
The period between 1550 and 1650 was a Golden Age of the Polish–Lithuanian Commonwealth (created in 1569) and a Golden Age of Poland. It was a time of economic prosperity due to grain trade. Grain was kept in richly embellished granaries (e.g. in Kazimierz Dolny) and transported along the Vistula to the main port of Poland - Gdańsk, where it was sold to the Netherlands, England, France, Italy and Spain (about 80% of the city's revenues in the beginning of the 17th century came from grain trade). It was also the time of religious tolerance due to the Warsaw Confederation (1573).

Poland was a multinational (Poles, Ruthenians, Jews, Germans, Italians, Dutch, Flemish, Armenians, Scots, Bohemians, Tatars) and multi-religious country (Roman Catholics, Eastern Orthodox, Greek Catholics, Calvinists, Lutherans, Muslims, Polish Brethren, Hussites and many others). All those nations and worships contributed to creation of the exceptional diversity of mannerist architecture and sculpture in Poland. The first half of the 17th century is marked by strong activity of the Jesuits and Counter-Reformation, which led to banishing of progressive Arians (Polish Brethren) in 1658 and which has its reflection in architecture (spread of baroque). Despite that Poland remain a "country without stakes". All the major wars and military conflicts were conducted far from the territory of today's Poland, so the country could developed equally. Those favorable conditions are the reason why mannerist architecture and sculpture in Poland left so many beautiful examples.

The mannerist architecture and sculpture have two major traditions: Polish-Italian and Netherlandish (Dutch-Flemish), that dominated in northern Poland. The Silesian mannerism of South-Western Poland was largely influenced by Bohemian and German mannerism, while the Pomeranian mannerism of North-Western Poland was influenced by Gothic tradition and Northern German mannerism. The Jews in Poland adapted patterns of Italian and Polish mannerism to their own tradition.

The major inspiration for many structures in Poland was early renaissance constructions at Wawel Hill - Sigismund's Chapel (1519–1533), tomb of king Sigismund I inside the chapel (1529–1531) and Wawel Castle's arcade courtyard (1506–1534), as well as buildings in Antwerp - City Hall (1561–1565), houses at Grote Markt and funeral sculptures by the Flemish artist Cornelis Floris de Vriendt. In conclusion the main criterion of differentiation between types of mannerism in Poland is the source of inspiration and in many cases the founders conception played an essential role for the final shape of the construction (e.g. Tomb of Jędrzej Noskowski in Maków Mazowiecki by Willem van den Blocke, is an example of Polish mannerism inspired by Tomb of Sigismund I with a founder depicted sleeping).

Triangle gables of late Gothic origin and large windows are the features of Dutch urban architecture in Northern Poland. The Polish mannerism, though largely dominated by Italian architects and sculptors, has its unique characteristics that differentiate it from its Italian equivalent (attics, decorational motives, construction and shape of buildings, Dutch, Bohemian and German influences). Among notable architects and sculptors of Netherlandish Mannerism in Poland were Anthonis van Obbergen, Willem van den Blocke, Abraham van den Blocke, Jan Strakowski, Paul Baudarth, Gerhard Hendrik, Hans Kramer and Regnier van Amsterdam and of Polish/Italian mannerism Santi Gucci, Jan Michałowicz of Urzędów, Giovanni Maria Padovano, Giovanni Battista di Quadro, Jan Frankiewicz, Galleazzo Appiani, Jan Jaroszewicz, Bernardo Morando, Kasper Fodyga, Krzysztof Bonadura, Antoneo de Galia and many others.

The architecture of the 16th-century Polish mannerism is marked by common usage of richly embellished attics of palaces and houses, arcade courtyards and side towers. The church architecture combined the late gothic tradition with renaissance symmetry and mannerist decoration. Churches were slender, usually without towers. The 17th-century Polish mannerism characterize with much more simplicity in decoration in benefit to harmony of the construction. The model to the early 17th-century residences were royal palaces. Ujazdów Castle constructed for king Sigismund III Vasa was possible inspiration to the Bishop Palace in Kielce, whereas the Kielce palace was imitated by many magnate families in their residencies (e.g. Tarło Palace in Podzamcze, 1645-1650 and Radziwiłł Palace in Biała Podlaska). This type of the palace is known as Poggio–Reale because it combined a square building with a central loggia with side towers as in Villa Poggio Reale near Naples (1487–1489) according to conception of Baldassare Peruzzi and Sebastiano Serlio. Side towers become an obligatory element of every palace and funeral church chapels, modelled after mentioned Sigismund's Chapel, flourished all over Poland (Staszów, Włocławek). Another characteristics of the mannerism in Poland are city and palace fortifications built in Dutch style (Zamość, Ujazd) and town halls with high towers (Biecz, Zamość, Poznań). The most popular decoration techniques were relief (Kazimierz Dolny), sgraffito (Krasiczyn) and rustication (Książ Wielki), whereas the material was mainly brick, plastered brick, sandstone and sometimes limestone. For some time the late renaissance coexisted with early baroque (introduced in Poland in 1597 with Church of SS. Peter and Paul in Kraków).

Netherlandish (Dutch-Flemish) and Polish-Italian architectural traditions were not isolated and penetrate each other to create (among others) a unique composition of Krzyżtopór Palace. This, one of the largest constructions of mannerism and early baroque in Poland, was intended as a fortified palace (type known in Poland under Italian name palazzo in fortezza). The complex combined Dutch style fortifications with a palace built to Italian design (inspirations of Palazzo Farnese in Caprarola are visible in the plan of the complex), mannerist Polish decoration and some other, presumably Dutch elements (octagonal tower resembling Binnenhof's Torentje in The Hague, spires). The palace was destroyed during the Deluge and currently remains in ruins.

Lublin region created its own style with folk motives (Kazimierz Dolny), while the urban mannerism in Greater Poland replaced the gothic gables with Italian style arcades, tympanums, friezes and pillars in tuscan order (Poznań). Warsaw, as one of the main cities of the Polish-Lithuanian Commonwealth and due to its role as seat of Parliament and King, was a place of meetings of cultures. The mannerist architecture in the city was a combination of many types of mannerist traditions, including Lublin type (Jesuit Church), Greater Poland mannerism (Kanonia), Italian mannerism with elements of early baroque (Royal Castle), Lesser Poland mannerism (Kryski Chapel), Poggio–Reale type (Villa Regia Palace - not existing), Bohemian and Netherlandish Mannerism (Ossoliński Palace - not existing, possible inspiration to palace's upper parts pavilion with characteristic roof was Bonifaz Wohlmut's reconstruction of Belvedere in Prague, 1557–1563).

The Bohemian mannerism had also large influence on the architecture and sculpture in Poland. This concerned not only the lands that were part of the Kingdom of Bohemia, like Silesia. The familiar relations between the Habsburgs and the Polish Vasas enabled to draw form the patterns of Prague mannerism. Both king Sigismund III and his son Władysław IV Vasa as well as magnates purchased many sculptures in Prague, especially those by Adriaen de Vries. Bohemian mannerism in Silesia joined the Prague renaissance with its brunelleschian arcades (inspired by Queen Anna Jagiellon's Belvedere in Prague, 1535–1537) and German influences originating from the late gothic (steep gable with renaissance decoration). Also Silesian mannerism had its impact on neighbouring regions - the arcade courtyard of the Piast Castle in Brzeg with arcades replaced in upper parts with columns (constructed by Francesco de Pario, 1556–1558) was possible inspiration for similar constructions in Bohemia - Opočno Castle (1560–1567), Jindřichův Hradec Castle (loggia, before 1597) and Schloss Güstrow in Germany (built by Pario after 1558).

Characteristic for Jewish mannerism in Poland is adjustment of the Polish/Italian patterns to the Jewish tradition, rejection of human images in benefit to the sophisticated floral-animal decorations (tendrils, lions), mythological creatures (unicorns, griffins) and Hebrew inscriptions. The synagogues were adorned with horizontal attics (Zamość) or had a richly decorated interior (Pińczów). The main decorating techniques were fresco (Tykocin, Pińczów), relief and stucco (Zamość).

The sculpture is mainly represented in sepulchral art and decorations of facades. Free standing sculptures are rare, though before the Deluge gardens of many residencies were adorned with sculptures (e.g. Villa Regia Palace's garden in Warsaw was embellished with sculptures by Adriaen de Vries). Also the free standing tomb monuments were uncommon. The tombs were generally constructed to be attached to the wall, exception is the Niedrzwicki Brothers Tomb in Koprzywnica. During the first stage of mannerism in Poland the tomb monuments were constructed according to the early renaissance tradition, where the deceased was depicted sleeping. They were generally made of sandstone, while the founder's figure was carved in red marble (e.g. Tarnowski Tomb in Tarnów Cathedral). In the beginning of the 17th century Dutch and Flemish architects and sculptors (especially Willem van den Blocke and his son Abraham) popularised in Poland new type of tomb monument originating from the Cornelis Floris workshop (e.g. not existing Tomb of duke Albert of Prussia in the Königsberg Cathedral). The founders were depicted kneeling, the construction was more spacious and it employ darker materials - brown marbles from Chęciny, black marbles from Dębnik or imported from the Spanish Netherlands (e.g. Tomb of Báthory brothers in Barczewo). Some of the most impressive Dutch style tombs in Poland were constructed far from the center of Netherlandish Mannerism in Poland - Gdańsk. These were tombs of Jan Tarnowski in Łowicz (1603–1604) and of Ostrogski family in Tarnów (1612–1620).

Many of the mannerist structures in Poland are postwar reconstructions. They were destroyed by the Germans during the World War II (e.g. all mannerist constructions in Warsaw, many Jewish pray houses) or damaged in Allied aerial bombings (Gdańsk, Wrocław). Also many were not restored after the war (e.g. tomb monument of Wolski Brothers in Warsaw by Jan Michałowicz destroyed in 1944; or Tarnów Synagogue, destroyed in 1939).

List of notable mannerist structures in Poland

Northern Poland

Central Poland

Southern Poland

Not existing structures

See also
Renaissance in Poland
Bartholomeus Strobel, the leading Mannerist painter in Poland
Northern Mannerism

References

 
Polish Renaissance

P
Mannerism
16th century in Poland
17th century in Poland
16th-century architecture
17th-century architecture